Krista Lee Kinsman  (born ) is a Canadian retired volleyball player, who played as a wing spiker.

She was part of the Canada women's national volleyball team at the 2002 FIVB Volleyball Women's World Championship in Germany.

References

External links
www.fivb.org
www.cev.lu

1978 births
Living people
Canadian women's volleyball players
Place of birth missing (living people)
Wing spikers